Frederick Hobson VC (23 September 1873 – 18 August 1917) was a soldier in the Canadian Expeditionary Force, and recipient of the Victoria Cross, the highest military award for gallantry in the face of the enemy given to British and Commonwealth forces, during the First World War.

Details
Hobson was from England, having emigrated in 1904. He had served previously in the British Army during the Second Boer War with the Wiltshire Regiment, and enlisted in the Canadian Expeditionary Force in November 1914. He was 43 years old, and a sergeant in the 20th Battalion (Central Ontario), CEF during World War I. On 18 August 1917 during the Battle of Hill 70 north-west of Lens, France, he performed a deed for which he was awarded the Victoria Cross.

Citation

Medal 

His Victoria Cross is displayed at the Canadian War Museum in Ottawa, Ontario, Canada. A replica of his medal and copy of his citation are also on display at the Sgt. F. Hobson VC Armoury in Simcoe, Canada.

References

Further reading 
Hobson, Frederick, Commonwealth War Graves Commission

External links 
 Frederick Hobson's digitized service file
 Veteran Affairs Canada page on Frederick Hobson
 Legion Magazine Article on Frederick Hobson
 Ontario Plaques – Sergeant Frederick Hobson, VC 1873 – 1917
 Hobson's Medals at the Canadian War Museum

Canadian World War I recipients of the Victoria Cross
1873 births
1917 deaths
Canadian military personnel killed in World War I
Military personnel from London
English emigrants to Canada
British Army personnel of the Second Boer War
Canadian Expeditionary Force soldiers
Wiltshire Regiment soldiers
Queen's York Rangers (1st American Regiment)